Elachista andorraensis is a moth of the family Elachistidae. It is found in Spain.

References

andorraensis
Moths described in 1988
Moths of Europe